Essen is a town and municipality in the Belgian province of Antwerp. As of september 2022, the municipality had 19,029 inhabitants. The municipality is bordered on three sides by the Netherlands. Essen belongs to the electoral canton of Brecht and the judicial canton of Kapellen. The municipality is located in the Noorderkempen.

Toponymy 
The name "Essen" is also attested as Esshen, Essche(n) or Esse. It is generally assumed that Essen refers to high lying fields near a watercourse or settlements along a stream. The tree species ash is also related to the town name (As the name in Dutch is es). It was a toponym that already appeared in Old Dutch in the meaning of 'boat of ash wood'. People liked to use the ash tree for building ships.

History

Prehistory 
On Essens territory there are four locations where finds from prehistoric times have been found. On the basis of four sites it is not easy to draw conclusions. One thing is clear: around 8,500 years ago people travelled around Essen and stopped here and there to camp and to work flint, for example to make arrowheads. A few of these flints have been found.

Abbey of Tongerlo 
Essen was given as an allodium in 1159 by Berner van Rijsbergen to Tongerlo Abbey, which however had to share the rights of lordship with the dukes of Brabant. Together with the more southerly situated Kalmthout and the Tongerlo part of Huijbergen (in the present-day Netherlands) it became one seigniory, which belonged to the abbey until the French Revolution.

Lootings 
In 1542 the village was sacked by the troops of Maarten van Rossum and in 1583 by the troops of Marshal Armand de Gontaut-Biron.

Border community and coat of arms 
In 1795, Essen became an independent municipality. Out of gratitude, the Essen people took over the coat of arms of prelate Hermans, the last abbot of Tongerlo. Hermans is also a surname that occurs in Essen. The two ox heads refer to the reclamation of the moors and symbolically to steadfastness, the lamb refers to grazing and symbolically to patience. Miter and staff still refer to the relationship with the abbey. In 1802 it also became an independent parish. Previously, Essen belonged to the parish of Nispen.

Belgian Revolution 
After the fall of Napoleon in 1815, the United Kingdom of the Netherlands was created under William I of Orange-Nassau. When the Southern Netherlands - present-day Belgium - seceded from the Netherlands in 1830, Essen became a border town. On 21 November 1830, an encounter between Belgian insurgents and Dutch soldiers took place during the Battle of Essen in the Belgian War of Independence. Essen's border was guarded by Walloon soldiers for a few years after separation from the Netherlands. On 20 November 1831 they went to Roosendaal to kick up a fuss. The revenge of the Dutch followed the next day. During high mass, 4,000 soldiers entered Essen and searched all the houses. Five soldiers and two villagers were killed. This happened during the Battle of the Hill.

Economic grow 
On 9 July 1852, Belgium and the Netherlands signed a treaty for the construction of a new railroad between Antwerp and Rotterdam. Thus, in the years 1852-54 the railroad line Antwerp - Lage Zwaluwe was built with a border station in Essen. Because of this route, the line missed the city of Breda. However, one of the founders of the Société Anonyme des chemins de fer d'Anvers à Rotterdam owned land in Essen and wanted it to increase in value. The train ensured that wealthy Antwerp residents came to Essen to find peace and quiet. The Essen students, workers and maids could more easily go to Antwerp to learn and work.

Essen railway station was and is the last railroad station before the Dutch border. The train station was then the most important border station between Belgium and the Netherlands. The many adjustment tracks still remind us of the border control of cross-border traffic. With the arrival of the railroad, the village indeed developed rapidly. The border function of the railroad station provided many jobs and made it an obligatory stop for international trains. A large commuter traffic developed with fast trains to Antwerp. Today there is only a stopping train and IC connection (with four stops) to Antwerp and Brussels-Midi as well as a stopping train connection to Roosendaal.

At the border station there were also quarantine stables since 1896 in which, until the 1970s, mainly cattle were placed in isolation via a special loading dock to check the animals for contagious diseases. In 1994 the Quarantine Stables were legally protected as a monument.

WW I 
During World War I, Essen was cut off from the outside world. The Germans didn't find it necessary to cordon off the "hump" (Essen is, if you look at the map, a kind of hump) by barbed wire and chose the easiest solution straight ahead. This is the so-called "Wire of death" of which there are many canvases with pictures of that time to be seen in Essen and Kalmthout. The neutral Netherlands in turn spanned the remaining kilometres. Despite the isolation, smugglers were prolific.

WW II 
When the German occupiers withdrew at the end of World War II, they left behind a trail of destruction. Many churches and especially church towers including the O.-L.-V. Geboortekerk of Essen-Centre, the Sint-Jan-Baptistkerk of Wildert and the Sint-Vincentius-à-Paulokerk of Horendonk, were dynamited because they were ideal vantage points. Only the Eucharistic Heart Church at College, the St. Anthony of Padua Church at Essen-Statie and the St. Peter's Church at Hoek were not destroyed. In addition, many V1 and V2 bombs fell in Essen, which were actually intended for the port of Antwerp.

Post-war history 
In 1959 a customs office was built on Nieuwstraat on the site where before World War II the O.-L.-V. Geboortekerk (Church of the Nativity) stood there before the Second World War. Essen was, after Wuustwezel, the busiest road office on the Belgian-Dutch border. It closed on 1 January 1993.

There has been a city contact with Essen (Oldenburg) in Germany since 1976.

In 1977, the municipalities were reorganized. Borders and land were rearranged so that they were distributed among the municipalities in a logical manner. This led to the creation of Essen-Hoek. Hoek had existed for many centuries, but had previously been divided into Kalmthoutsehoek or Kalmthoutse Hoek and Essen-Hoek or Moerkant. The parish of Hoek has existed for 150 years, therefore the amalgamation was more of a formality.

Geography 
Essen is the third most northerly municipality in Belgium and is sandwiched between the municipality of Kalmthout and the Dutch border. This makes it, together with Momignies, one of the two Belgian municipalities that borders on only one other Belgian municipality. The other neighboring municipalities are Dutch. Looking at the map, Essen appears to be a sort of "hump". Essen is the most northwestern municipality of the Kempen and the most northern municipality of the Noorderkempen.

Towns / Districts 
Essen has no boroughs. In addition to the village center called "Essen-Centre", there are a few neighbourhoods and hamlets on the territory. The district Heikant connects to the west of the village center. A little further west is the rural residential ribbon Essen-Hoek. To the east of the center lies the hamlet of Horendonk. To the south of the municipality lies the hamlet of Wildert. West of the center lies the district of Statie.

In 1977 the Belgian municipalities were redistributed. Essen received a piece of the hamlet of Kalmthoutse Hoek. This was added to Essen-Hoek.

Neighbourhoods 
The town of Essen consists of the districts Essen-Centre and Essen-Statie. These in turn count several neighborhoods including De Heuvel, De Donk, Spijker, Zandstraat, Werf, Bredestraat, Schanker, Schriek, Steenpaal, Vennen, Schildershof, Hemelrijk, Statievelden and Hondsberg.

Neighbouring municipalities 
North: Roosendaal (NL), Ruchphen (NL)

East: Zundert (NL)

South: Kalmthout (BE)

West: Woensdrecht (NL)

Landmarks 

 de Kiekenhoeve, an old farm from 1776 close to the Wheelbarrow museum in the Moerkantsebaan
 the Quarantine Stables where until the 1970s mainly cattle were placed in isolation via a special unloading quay to check the animals for contagious diseases, located in the Hemelrijk
 Essen railway station
 the old SNCB goods shed, close to Essen Railway station
 some mansions in the Nieuwstraat
 the old presbytery, which was the residence of the priests of Essen-Nispen for 500 years. The first mention of the Old Rectory dates back to 1362. It now serves as a cultural centre. Both in 1422 and in 1557 the pastor was murdered there. After its destruction in 1586, it was rebuilt under the leadership of Abbot Piera. His coat of arms was affixed above the door. What remains today is only a quarter of what it once was.
 The Eucharistic Heart Church of the College of the Eucharistic Heart and the school itself, right next to the Father's Garden or Park Fathers Redemptorists in the Rouwmoer. This Redemptorist monastery with church and school was built in 1908 on the site of a former abbey farm: the Rouwmoershoeve. A copper Sacred Heart statue measuring 4.5 m high is placed on top of the church. In the garden there is a Lourdes grotto. Some filming of the television series Salamander took place here.
 The Bakersmill from 1981 in the Sint-Jansstraat in Wildert. This mill is the youngest in Flanders.
 The Mill of Aerden, a windmill remnant
 The St. Anthony of Padua Church by architect Jules Bilmeyer at Sint-Antoniusplein
The Church of Our Lady of Grace

Museums 
 the Karrenmuseum on Moerkantsebaan
 The Gerard Meeusen museum in the attic of the town hall at Heuvelplein
 The steam museum in the Bakkersmolen in the Sint-Jansstraat
 Robotland, technological do-center next to the station
 't Kniphof, paper cutting art in Essen-Horendonk

Nature 
Several streams run through Essen. The longest and best known is probably the Kleine Aa. It flows from the south of the municipality along the east side of the village centre of Wildert to then flow into the north of the municipality along the east side of the village centre of Essen.

Hydrography 
 Molenbeek
 Biezebeek
 Papenmoerbeek
 Old Moervaart
 Spillebeek
 Kleine Aa or Wildertse Beek near Wildert.
 Roosendaalse Vaart

Natural Areas 
 The Forest Museum Wildert Dunes
 The Horendonk Woods or Essen Dunes
 The Redemptorist Fathers' Park or the Father's Garden

Demographics

Demografische ontwikkeling 

Sources: NIS, Note:1806 through 1981=population censuses; 1990 and later=population on January 1

As of October 2017, Essen has more than 19,000 residents. Almost one in five Essen citizens has Dutch nationality.

Politics

Structure 
The municipality of Essen is part of the electoral district of Brecht, located in the provincial district of Kapellen, the electoral district of Antwerp and finally the electoral district of Antwerp.

City Council

History

(Previous) Mayors 

Legislature 2001 - 2006

A coalition was formed between CVP and VLD. The mayor was Frans Schrauwen.

Legislature 2007 - 2012

The previous coalition was rejected by the voters. A coalition was made between CD&V and sp.a. The latter party made an explicit condition to end Schrauwen's mandate as mayor.

Legislature 2013 - 2018

The mayor is Gaston Van Tichelt (CD&V). He leads a coalition consisting of CD&V and sp.a. Together they form the majority with 14 out of 25 seats.

Legislature 2019 - 2024

In the municipal elections of October 2018, there were some changes regarding the emerging parties. Open VLD and Piratenpartij did not emerge anymore and some members of Vlaams Belang tore off from their party and these emerged under the name "Essen's Belang".

The cartel party N-VA/PLE became the largest party by two votes over CD&V and the cartel went up 4.7%. As a result, N-VA/PLE gained one more seat than in the previous election and obtained one more seat than CD&V, which lost one seat. CD&V and N-VA/PLE obtained the same percentage of votes, namely 34.7%. sp.a retained its four seats . Vlaams Belang obtained two seats, one more than in the previous election. Essen's Belang did not exceed the electoral threshold.

The previous Roman-red coalition CD&V-sp.a was continued with a majority of 13 to 25 seats and N-VA/PLE ended up in the opposition. Gaston Van Tichelt again became mayor.

Results of municipal elections since 1976 

The red numbers next to the data indicate the name under which the parties appeared in each election.
The seats of the majority formed are in bold. The largest party is in color. (*) 1994: PVDA / 2006: Vuurwerk !!! / 2012: Piratenpartij / 2018: Essen's Belang

Culture

Music 
 Kommil Foo

Events 
 Carnival (the largest parade in the Noorderkempen)
 Hoekse Kermis, first weekend in July, with the traditional folk games on Monday.
 Pumpkin Festival with Pumpkin Procession (first Sunday in October)
 Wildert Fun Fair (October)
 Owl Fair (4 days in September, concluded with games)
 Craft Day (last Sunday of August)
 Christmas beer festival with international appeal (mid-December)
 Each youth movement in Essen also has its own annual event.

Religion 
Essen is located in the deanery of Noorderkempen in the diocese of Antwerp and has many churches (located in the parishes listed below) including:

 Church of Our Lady of the Nativity in Essen-Centre
 St Anthony of Padua church in Essen-Statie
 St John Baptist church in Wildert
 Verrezen Heerkerk in Heikant
 St Peter's church at Essen-Hoek
 St Vincent de Paul church in Horendonk
 Eucharistic Heart Church, a monastery church at the College of the Eucharistic Heart, this one has been deconsecrated.

Mobility

Road traffic 
Four N-roads run through Essen: the N125, the N117, the N122 and the N133.

Public transportation 
The municipality of Essen has two stations. There is the border station on railroad line 12 Antwerp - Roosendaal and is served by the L-train Roosendaal - Antwerp-Central and on weekdays also by the IC-train Essen - Brussels-South - Charleroi-South. The village of Wildert also has its own train stop.

From Essen there is a bus line of De Lijn with number 670 to Kapellen and a bus line with number 674 to Stabroek via Wildert.

Sports 
In Essen, there are 4 football clubs: Excelsior FC Essen, KFC Olympic Essen, Horendonk FC and KSV Wildert play.

Events 
 The Ronde van Essen, a running race (last full week of August, every day in a different Essen district)
 IKO cyclocross, a ride for the DVV insurance trophy organized at the Hemelrijk

Famous Essenarians (current or former inhabitants) 
Famous people who were born or live in Essen or have other significant links with the municipality:

 Bart Aernouts, cyclocross rider
 Pieter Andriessen, musicologist
 Pam Cornelissen, Dutch politician
 Sachli Gholamalizad, actress and theatre maker
 Jef van Gool (1935-2022), soccer player
 Jan Goossenaerts, from 2010 to 2012, he was the oldest man in Belgium and Europe.
 Rose Gronon, poet
 Ditte Jaspers, actress
 Hubert Lampo, writer
 Ludo Loos, cyclist
 Gustave Magnel, engineer and professor at the University of Ghent
 Tom Meeusen, cyclo-cross rider
 René Melis, journalist and writer
 Paul Pauli, painter and writer
 Michiel Rampaart, actor
 Zdeněk Štybar, cyclo-cross rider
 Herman Suykerbuyk, politician
 Dries van Noten, fashion designer
 Cara Van der Auwera, singer, actress, presenter
 Inga Verhaert, politician
 Mich and Raf Walschaerts, cabaret artist (Kommil Foo)
 Hannes Delcroix, footballer
 Frank Focketyn, actor
 Philip Braat, a Scottish Labour politician

Partner cities 
 Essen (Oldenburg) (Germany)
 Šilalė (Lithuania)
 Žilina (Slovakia)
Hradištko (Czech Republic)
Witzenberg (South Africa)

Nearby centres 
Horendonk, Nispen, Essen-Hoek, Wildert, Nieuwmoer

References

External links 

 Official website of the municipality
 Official youth website of the municipality
 Tourist website of the municipality
 Essen-Hoek community site
 Heritage inventory

 
Municipalities of Antwerp Province
Belgium–Netherlands border crossings
Populated places in Antwerp Province